William Carr Buckworth was an Irish politician.

Buckworth was born in Cashel and educated at Trinity College, Dublin. 

Buckworth was MP for the Irish constituency of Cashel from 1739 until 1753.

References

Alumni of Trinity College Dublin
People from Cashel, County Tipperary
Members of the Parliament of Ireland (pre-1801) for County Tipperary constituencies
Irish MPs 1727–1760